The 2022–23 Vierde Divisie is a Dutch football league season played in four sections, two on Saturday and two on Sunday. The champions of each Vierde Divisie section will be directly promoted to the Derde Divisie; other teams can get promoted through play-offs.

Play-offs

Promotion 
In each competition teams play periods of 10 games, three times per season (30 games per season). After each period the best team which has not yet qualified earns a spot in the play-offs for the Derde Divisie as the period champion. 6 teams from the Saturday Vierde Divisie play against 2 teams from the Saturday Derde Divisie for 2 promotion spots. The teams from the Sunday leagues do the same.

Relegation 
The teams in place 13 and 14 at the end of the season fight against relegation in the relegation play-offs. They face the period champions of the Eerste Klasse.

Saturday A

Teams

Number of teams by province

Standings

Fixtures/results

Saturday B

Teams

Number of teams by province

Standings

Fixtures/results

Sunday A

Teams

Number of teams by province

Standings

Fixtures/results

Sunday B

Teams

Number of teams by province

Standings

Fixtures/results

References 

Vierde Divisie seasons
Vierde Divisie
Netherlands